The 2009 Sun Belt Conference men's basketball tournament was held March 4–10, 2009. The first round was held at campus sites and all subsequent rounds took place in Hot Springs, Arkansas at the Summit Arena. The semifinals were televised by ESPN Regional Television. The Sun Belt Conference Championship Game was televised by ESPN2.

The tournament was won by the WKU Hilltoppers, in front of a crowd of 3,493.

Bracket

Asterisk denotes game ended in overtime.

External links
https://web.archive.org/web/20090314073609/http://www.sunbeltsports.org/ViewArticle.dbml?DB_OEM_ID=4100&ATCLID=1550959

References

Sun Belt Conference men's basketball tournament
Tournament
Sun Belt Conference men's basketball tournament
Sun Belt Conference men's basketball tournament